SS Excelsior may refer to one of these ships:

 , an Australian ferry, in service 1883–1919
 SS Excelsior (1894), renamed SS Petrolite, an oil tanker in service with the Standard Oil Company of New Jersey from 1894 to 1917
  (MC hull number 589, Type C3-S-A3), built by Bethlehem Sparrows Point Shipyard; acquired by the United States Navy and converted to  USS Windsor (APA-55); sold for commercial service in 1947; scrapped in 1972
  (MC hull number 5891, Type C3-S-A3), built by Bethlehem Sparrows Point Shipyard; acquired by the United States Army for use as troop ship ; carried troops from England to Normandy for D-Day; sold for commercial service in 1946; scrapped in 1970

Ship names